German Submarine U-222 was a Type VIIC U-boat of Nazi Germany's Kriegsmarine during World War II.

She was laid down at the F. Krupp Germaniawerft yard in Kiel as yard number 652 on 16 June 1941, launched on 28 March 1942 and commissioned on 23 May under Oberleutnant zur See Ralf von Jessen. She was part of the 8th U-boat Flotilla, a training organization.

Design
German Type VIIC submarines were preceded by the shorter Type VIIB submarines. U-222 had a displacement of  when at the surface and  while submerged. She had two shafts and two  propellers.

U-222 was fitted with five  torpedo tubes (four fitted at the bow and one at the stern), fourteen torpedoes, one  SK C/35 naval gun, 220 rounds, and a  C/30 anti-aircraft gun. The boat had a complement of between forty-four and sixty.

References

Bibliography

External links

U-boats commissioned in 1942
1942 ships
U-boats sunk in 1942
U-boats sunk in collisions
German Type VIIC submarines
World War II submarines of Germany
Ships built in Kiel
Maritime incidents in September 1942